Arsenopyrite (IMA symbol: Apy) is an iron arsenic sulfide (FeAsS). It is a hard (Mohs 5.5-6) metallic, opaque, steel grey to silver white mineral with a relatively high specific gravity of 6.1.  When dissolved in nitric acid, it releases elemental sulfur.  When arsenopyrite is heated, it produces sulfur and arsenic vapor.  With 46% arsenic content, arsenopyrite, along with orpiment, is a principal ore of arsenic.  When deposits of arsenopyrite become exposed to the atmosphere, the mineral slowly converts into  iron arsenates.  Arsenopyrite is generally an acid-consuming sulfide mineral, unlike iron pyrite which can lead to acid mine drainage.

The crystal habit, hardness, density, and garlic odour when struck are diagnostic. Arsenopyrite in older literature may be referred to as mispickel, a name of German origin.

Arsenopyrite also can be associated with significant amounts of gold. Consequently, it serves as an indicator of gold bearing reefs. Many arsenopyrite gold ores are refractory, i.e. the gold is not easily cyanide leached from the mineral matrix.

Arsenopyrite is found in high temperature hydrothermal veins, in pegmatites, and in areas of contact metamorphism or metasomatism.

Crystallography

Arsenopyrite crystallizes in the monoclinic crystal system and often shows prismatic crystal or columnar forms with striations and twinning common. Arsenopyrite may be referred to in older references as orthorhombic, but it has been shown to be monoclinic.  In terms of its atomic structure, each Fe center is linked to three As atoms and three S atoms.  The material can be described as Fe3+ with the diatomic trianion AsS3−.  The connectivity of the atoms is more similar to that in marcasite than pyrite.  The ion description is imperfect because the material is semiconducting and the Fe-As and Fe-S bonds are highly covalent.

Related minerals

Various transition group metals can substitute for iron in arsenopyrite. The arsenopyrite group includes the following rare minerals:
Clinosafflorite: 
Gudmundite: 
Glaucodot or alloclasite:  or 
Iridarsenite: 
Osarsite or ruarsite:  or

See also
 
 Classification of minerals
 List of minerals

References

External links
 

Iron minerals
Sulfide minerals
Arsenic minerals
Monoclinic minerals
Minerals in space group 14